National Sunday Law may refer to:

Blue laws in predominantly Christian countries
Sunday Sabbatarian ecclesiastical laws in certain national Christian denominations
National Sunday Law, a book by Seventh-day Adventist author Jan Marcussen